Revis was an American post-grunge band from Carbondale, Illinois. They released one major label album, Places for Breathing, in 2003 before disbanding in 2005. After a five-year hiatus, the band reformed in 2010 and began work on a follow-up EP, Fire and Ice. The sessions were so prolific that the project turned into a full album release with a new name, now titled Do We Have to Beg?. The album was completed and scheduled for release on May 20, 2011, however, "legal issues" and internal disagreements with their record label kept them from releasing the album, quietly delaying it days before release. The band initially announced plans to re-record the entire album without the help of a label, but after a quiet year with few updates, the band announced they had broken up in May 2012, without any plans on releasing the album outside of a few songs that had been released previously for promotional purposes. Their best known song is "Caught in the Rain" which peaked at number 8 on the Billboard Mainstream Rock chart in 2003 after appearing on the soundtrack of the film Daredevil.

History

Early years (1999–2001)
The group, formerly known as Orco, was formed in the summer of 1999 in the small town of Ewing, Illinois. Their first big break came when they beat out 40 other musical groups for the chance to compete against five bands at radio station WTAO's Battle of the Bands at the Du Quoin State Fair in August 2000. They won the competition and were offered the opportunity to play live remotes for the station. According to vocalist Justin Holman, "It wasn't long after that, that our songs began creeping onto (WTAO's) playlist." The original Orco line-up consisted of Justin Holman (vocals), Robert Davis (guitar), Nathaniel Cox (guitar), Dan Sronce (bass) and Marcus D'Marco (drums).
The band moved to Los Angeles in July 2001 but, before doing so, had to acquire a new bassist in Bob Thiemann. Despite, as guitarist Robert Davis put it, having enough hometown popularity to "play in front of 1,500 people every Friday night," the band set their sights for L.A. Orco began playing L.A. venues but had a tough time early on, being kicked out of a rented one-room bedroom and having a dismissive manager with whom they periodically spoke with.

The band's earlier material under this name was quite different sounding than their work as Revis. Songs such as "Feast of the Tabernacles" featured a much rougher, unpolished sound, with some screaming vocals.

Places for Breathing (2002–2003)
With the help of a new manager, John Zagata, they recorded three demo songs, "A Gift," "Seven," and "Straight Jacket Labels" with producers Tommy Henriksen and Jeff Pilson. This eventually caught the attention of record labels, and demos for "Caught in the Rain" and "Spin" were subsequently recorded to maintain hype. In January 2002, the band signed with Epic Records to start work on their first album at NRG Recording in North Hollywood. Some of their demo songs would end up on their debut album; others were written during NRG's recording session.

It was during the five weeks of recording that the band was forced to change its name to Revis because a UK band had been using the Orco name for six years compared to the American band's three years. They chose the name "Revis" after their close friend and guitar tech Jason Revis who had been with the band since its inception even without pay; only through their joining a major label would he finally start being paid.

The end result of their efforts was a debut album entitled Places for Breathing, which was released on May 20, 2003.  The album debuted at No. 1 on Billboard's Heatseekers chart, selling 10,000 copies in its opening week, and peaked at No. 115 on the Billboard Top 200.
Revis released two singles to rock radio hits, "Caught in the Rain", and "Seven". The first single, "Caught in the Rain" peaked at number 8 on the Mainstream Rock Radio charts during a 26-week chart run, and was on the Billboard Alternative Rock charts for 16 weeks, peaking at number 20. It was also featured in the movie Daredevil and its respective soundtrack, Daredevil: The Album. The second single, "Seven", charted on Billboard's Mainstream Rock chart, but only peaking at number 29 over its ten weeks on the chart.
The band's hometown of Carbondale announced May 19, 2003 "Revis Day" in tribute to the group.

The band went on to support the album by touring with popular groups like Oleander, and Evanescence, and playing the 2003 Nintendo Fusion Tour.

Breakup (2004–2009)
In 2004, Revis recorded a second demo with Tony Berg and had intentions of rerecording such tracks for a second album. Despite the band's rising popularity, however, Revis would be dropped from Epic Records and forced to acquire new management after their first album. Holman speculated this being due to poor management and the merging of BMG and Sony. Around this time, Davis and Piribauer had joined a band named Hensley and caused question over the future of Revis. Holman and Cox, without Davis, Piribauer, or Thiemann, returned to Illinois and together began writing new material akin to Revis. As of August 2005, Holman affirmed that he and Tommy Henriksen were working on 12–15 new songs with titles such as "New Ways," "Hollow Days," "Red Letter Day," and "Taste in the Flash." However, he clarified that they would not be working with Don Gilmore or Ken Andrews and showed uncertainty in regards to finding a label and touring. Later in the year, it was announced that Revis had ultimately disbanded.

While the band had broken up, a number of members did their own projects. Davis and Cox had formed a new band by the name of Maryandi, later renamed The Yelling. Holman worked with a new project called Aujalyn. The bassist Thiemann went on to form TJ Brown, Dove Lane and Deep Space Radio.

Reunion, cancelled albums, and second breakup (2010–2012)
Reports of a Revis reunion surfaced in early 2010, saying that they were back together and working on a second album. However, original guitarist Nathaniel Cox and bassist Bob Thiemann decided not to take part in the reunion.

The band originally announced two separate releases, an EP titled Fire and Ice, and a full-length album to follow, titled Gone So Long. Fire and Ice, was announced to be released on July 27, 2010, but the album was delayed, and the two releases were consolidated into one single album, titled Do We Have to Beg?.

Despite the delayed release, the band did release some single songs. The first song released after the reunion was "A Better Day (Relief)" in June 2010. A second track, "Are You Taking Me Home", was released a few months later in October 2010. It was mixed by Jay Baumgardner and was released on October 6, 2010 via the band's website. Later in the month, the band played their first live concert since their reunion. The band debuted a new song, titled "Remember When", at the concert and released a studio acoustic version of a new track, "Searching for Someone" afterwards. The band rounded out the year with a re-recorded version of the track "From That Point On", a b-side left off their first album.

In February 2011, the band announced that Do We Have to Beg? would be released on May 20, 2011 to coincide with the 8 year anniversary of the release of Places for Breathing. A track list wasn't announced, but some song information was revealed. An electric, full-band version of "Searching For Someone" was initially announced as the first single, but the band changed their mind and decided to release "Save Our Souls" as the first single.  Additionally, the album was to consist of 12 songs selected from a group of 25 recorded songs.  "Save Our Souls" was released on April 1.

While the band announced the "Turnstyle Tour" to support the album, the tour was canceled on May 13, just a week before the album's projected release date, due to circumstances that were beyond their control. After a week of silence and no promotion, the album release was quietly delayed indefinitely, without a new date, due to undisclosed legal issues.

In June, the band released a final track from the sessions, "Fire and Ice", as an apology and "thank you" for the patience from their fans. However, it wasn't until August, three months after the album delay, that the band announced that legal issues kept them from ever releasing the album in its then-current form, so they are currently in the process of re-recording the entire album. After four more months of silence, drummer David Piribauer reiterated the band's intent to re-record the album, blaming the lack of progress on his seriously injured leg.

After 4 more months of silence, almost a year after the album's initial release date, guitarist Robert Davis confirmed that Revis had disbanded. The issues regarding Do We Have To Beg? not being released involved what the band perceived as an unfair contract with the record label. The band disagreed about how to continue, re-recording of their second album never took off, and the band members eventually stopped contacting each other. There is still no intention to ever release the second album.

Davis summed up the band's label issues and eventual demise:  We had no contract with the label the whole time we were working with them, and they were helping us start our career and put money towards a tour...We went back to the same studio and had this conversation with Jay Baumgardner, and he said he’d love to sign us but they weren’t close to getting contracts done. So we said let’s start recording and get the ball rolling, and we did, but then this contract got presented to us that just wasn’t fair. It just didn’t make any sense, and we wouldn’t have been able to survive off the terms. We went out and did a little bit of touring, and that got cut short because of the financing, and then we couldn’t see eye to eye about the choice to keep going. I wanted to keep touring, Justin didn’t. He wanted something more secure, and I said let’s just play the shows because there were fans out there, but we just didn’t see eye to eye. I’m not saying I was right or I was wrong, we just couldn’t decide what we should do and we couldn’t be together any more. Later on we had some more conversations that went in the same direction, and we couldn’t see eye to eye. Eventually we just stopped talking. There were so many good songs that I want to get out there, but we just can’t put them out with that band. I’m doing everything I can to help [the songs] see the light of day through other projects.
Davis did iterate that some of the songs may still see release as part of the future "Save Our Souls" documentary soundtrack, which, despite the name, is not about the Revis song, but about the effects of Hurricane Katrina on the burlesque industry of New Orleans.

Members
Justin Holman – lead vocals (1999–2005, 2010–2012)
Robert Davis – lead guitar (1999–2005, 2010–2012)
David Piribauer – drums (1999–2005, 2010–2012)
Kyle Needham – guitar (2011)
Simon Huber – bass guitar (2011)
Nathaniel Cox – rhythm guitar (1999–2005)
Bob Thiemann – bass guitar (1999–2005)

Touring musicians
Kevin Haaland – guitar (live) (2010)
Brad Smith (Blind Melon) – bass guitar (live) (2010)

Discography

Studio albums

Singles

References

External links
 http://www.myspace.com/revisreunion

Musical groups from Illinois
American post-grunge musical groups
Musical groups established in 1999
Musical groups disestablished in 2005
Musical groups reestablished in 2010
Musical groups disestablished in 2012
Carbondale, Illinois
1999 establishments in Illinois